This is a list of United Nations Security Council Resolutions 1501 to 1600 adopted between 26 August 2003 and 4 May 2005.

See also 
 Lists of United Nations Security Council resolutions
 List of United Nations Security Council Resolutions 1401 to 1500
 List of United Nations Security Council Resolutions 1601 to 1700

1501